The Avaya Secure Router 4134 (or SR-4134) in telecommunications and computer networking  technologies is a device manufactured by Avaya that combines the functions of WAN Routing, stateful firewall security, Ethernet switching, IP telephony, and Microsoft mediation into one device. In addition to sharing many features with other routers such as VRRP, MPLS, and hot-switchable modules, the SR-4134 also guards against individual circuit failures, has the ability to recover from device failures in less than a second, and instantly restores bandwidth once a connection has been repaired. The system is very energy-efficient and can save the owner as much as 40% on energy total cost of ownership, according to testing by the Tolly Group.  In July 2011, it was integrated with the Silver Peak WAN optimization appliance to optimize the performance of enterprise voice, video, and unified communications (UC), to ensure that remote users have fast and reliable access to all centralized applications.

Operational deployment
This system is normally installed at headquarters, regional or branch office and connected across the wide area network to another router or secure router at a regional, branch or other smaller remote location.

Modules

Several telecommunication modules for use with T1/E1 and DS3 ports (clear channel or channelized) will allow the system to operate over a wide range of telecommunication circuits.  In addition to supporting up to seventy-two power over ethernet ports, the secure router 4134 can also support up to thirty-one T1/E1 ports, fifty-eight gigabit ethernet switching ports, or up to sixty-four FXO or FXS ports.

The Firewall is capable of supporting Session Initiation Protocol (SIP) ALG, network translation and cone network translation for the UNIStim protocol).

Security
The Avaya secure router 4134 has fully integrated firewalls and VPNs for increased reliability; it also includes a stateful packet firewall and prevention of over 60 distributed denial of service attacks.

 Cryptographic Module Validation (FIPS140-1 and FIPS 140-2) 
 The SR-2330 has been validated as conforming to the Digital Signature Algorithm (DSA) specified in both FIPS 186-2 with Change Notice 1 dated October 5, 2001, and FIPS 186-3 dated June 2009, both titled Digital Signature Standard (DSS).
 NIST has validated the Secure Hash Algorithms.

See also
 Avaya
 Network security
 Avaya Professional Credentials

References

Further reading

External links

Secure Router 4134 Series - Retrieved 22 July 2011

S
S
Hardware routers
Innovative Communications Alliance products